Cyperus dichromus is a species of sedge that is endemic to parts of Africa.

The species was first formally described by the botanist Charles Baron Clarke in 1906.

See also
 List of Cyperus species

References

dichromus
Taxa named by Charles Baron Clarke
Plants described in 1906
Flora of Kenya
Flora of Somalia